Shkëlzen is an Albanian masculine given name, taken from the mountain of the same name in northern Albania. Notable people bearing the name Shkëlzen include:

Shkëlzen Baftiari (born 1986), Albanian pianist and educator
Shkëlzen Doli (born 1971), Albanian pianist
Shkëlzen Gashi (born 1988), Albanian footballer
Shkëlzen Kelmendi (born 1985), Albanian footballer
Shkëlzen Maliqi (born 1947), Kosovar philosopher, art critic, and political analyst
Shkëlzen Ruçi (born 1992), Albanian footballer
Shkëlzen Shala (born 1983), Albanian entrepreneur and veganism activist

References

Masculine given names
Albanian masculine given names